The 1926 International Lawn Tennis Challenge was the 21st edition of what is now known as the Davis Cup. 19 teams would enter the Europe Zone, while 5 would enter the America Zone.

France defeated Japan in the Inter-Zonal play-off, but would fall to the United States in a rematch of 1925's Challenge Round. The final was played at the Germantown Cricket Club in Philadelphia, Pennsylvania, United States on 9–11 September.

America Zone

Draw

Final
Japan vs. Cuba

Europe Zone

Draw

Final
France vs. Great Britain

Inter-Zonal Final
France vs. Japan

Challenge Round
United States vs. France

See also
 1926 Wightman Cup

References

External links
Davis Cup official website

Davis Cups by year
 
International Lawn Tennis Challenge
International Lawn Tennis Challenge
International Lawn Tennis Challenge
International Lawn Tennis Challenge